Aberdeen–Matawan is a station on NJ Transit's North Jersey Coast Line, located in Aberdeen and Matawan, Monmouth County, New Jersey, United States. This station, convenient to Route 35 and the PNC Bank Arts Center, is popular with both commuters and concertgoers, and is the busiest station on the line between Bay Head and Rahway.

The station is located at grade on Atlantic Avenue, on the border of Aberdeen and Matawan, and has two high side platforms, as well as two abandoned low side platforms, and two tracks. A ticket office is located on the New York-bound platform. All trains on the North Jersey Coast Line serve this station. The former Freehold Branch can still be traced in a southeastern parking lot.

History
For many years, the New York and Long Branch Railroad-built station was known as just Matawan, as its stationhouse and main platform were in Matawan, and only an auxiliary platform and large extra parking area were in Aberdeen.

The original building was opened on July 1, 1875 as a temporary station for regular service. It was the first station built on the line and was estimated to cost between $4,000 and $6,000 at the time. In 1982, the original building was closed and replaced by a small, one-story building on the north side of the tracks, to accommodate morning rush hour travelers commuting into New York City. The station was electrified in 1983 under New Jersey Transit as just a one-stop extension from the original end of electrification under the Pennsylvania Railroad in South Amboy. In 1984, the original station building was listed in the New Jersey Register of Historic Places and National Register of Historic Places as part of the Operating Passenger Railroad Stations Thematic Resource.

When the station was reconstructed and expanded in the 1990s, the new stationhouse and main platforms were built on the Aberdeen (eastern) side of Atlantic Avenue. NJ Transit considered renaming the station to just Aberdeen, but Matawan officials protested, since much of the town's recognition factor was due to the heavy use of the station by central New Jersey residents. Thus, the joint Aberdeen-Matawan name was adopted. In 2003, the area surrounding the station was designated a Transit Village by the New Jersey Department of Transportation. Work began on the redevelopment of the surrounding area in August 2016.

All three station buildings are still in existence.

Station layout
The station has two high-level side platforms.

See also
List of NJ Transit stations
National Register of Historic Places listings in Monmouth County, New Jersey

References

External links

Aberdeen-Matawan New Jersey Transit Station (The Subway Nut)

Railway stations in Monmouth County, New Jersey
NJ Transit Rail Operations stations
Railway stations in the United States opened in 1875
Railway stations on the National Register of Historic Places in New Jersey
Former Central Railroad of New Jersey stations
Former New York and Long Branch Railroad stations
National Register of Historic Places in Monmouth County, New Jersey
Matawan, New Jersey
Aberdeen Township, New Jersey
New Jersey Register of Historic Places